In geometry, the conic constant (or Schwarzschild constant, after Karl Schwarzschild) is a quantity describing conic sections, and is represented by the letter K.  The constant is given by  where  is the eccentricity of the conic section.

The equation for a conic section with apex at the origin and tangent to the y axis is

alternately

where R is the radius of curvature at .

This formulation is used in geometric optics to specify oblate elliptical, spherical, prolate elliptical, parabolic, and hyperbolic lens and mirror surfaces.  When the paraxial approximation is valid, the optical surface can be treated as a spherical surface with the same radius.

Some non-optical design references use the letter p as the conic constant.  In these cases, .

References

Mathematical constants
Conic sections
Geometrical optics